Exoacantha is a genus of flowering plants belonging to the family Apiaceae. It has only one species, Exoacantha heterophylla, native from southern Turkey to Syria.

References

Apioideae
Monotypic Apioideae genera